St. Martin's Chapel may refer to:
 St. Martin's Chapel, Furtwangen, Germany
 St Martin's Chapel, Baħrija, Malta
 St Martin's Chapel, Chisbury, United Kingdom

See also
 St. Martin's Church (disambiguation)